Henry Caulfeild(1779-1862) was an Irish politician.

Caulfeild was educated at  Trinity College, Dublin. He represented  Armagh from 1802 to 1806 and again from  1815 to 1818 and finally from 1820 to 1830.

References

UK MPs 1802–1806
UK MPs 1812–1818
UK MPs 1820–1826
UK MPs 1826–1830
Members of the Parliament of Ireland (pre-1801) for County Armagh constituencies
Alumni of Trinity College Dublin